Ballidon is a civil parish in the Derbyshire Dales district of Derbyshire, England.  The parish contains 15 listed buildings that are recorded in the National Heritage List for England.  All the listed buildings are designated at Grade II, the lowest of the three grades, which is applied to "buildings of national importance and special interest".  The parish contains the villages of Ballidon and Pikehall, and Ballidon Quarry, and is otherwise entirely rural.  Most of the listed buildings are farmhouses and farm buildings, two of which has been converted for other uses by the quarry.  The other listed buildings are a church, a milestone, a lime kiln, and an embankment and bridge, originally carrying a railway, and later part of the High Peak Trail.


Buildings

References

Citations

Sources

 

Lists of listed buildings in Derbyshire